Kevin Krawietz and Andreas Mies were the defending champions but chose not to defend their title.

Gerard Granollers and Pedro Martínez won the title after defeating Luis David Martínez and Fernando Romboli 6–3, 6–4 in the final.

Seeds

Draw

References

External links
 Main draw

Marbella Tennis Open - Doubles